Jaime Rios, (August 14, 1953 – March 20, 2019) was a Panamanian former professional boxer from 1973–1992.  His professional record is 22–5–1 and he held the inaugural title of WBA Light Flyweight champion between 1975–1976.

Professional boxing record

See also
List of light flyweight boxing champions
List of WBA world champions

References

External links
 

Panamanian boxers
1953 births
2019 deaths
Light-flyweight boxers